Dora E. Thompson (1876June 23, 1954) was the fourth Army Nurse Corps Superintendent, and the first selected from within the Corps, having served as an Army nurse for 12 years prior to her appointment. Thompson was born in 1876, at Cold Spring, New York, to parents Arthur Thompson, and Dora Thompson. In 1876, she graduated from New York Hospital Training School for Nurses. When she first joined the Army Nurse Corps, she was assigned to the Army General Hospital at Presidio of San Francisco, where she oversaw the hospital through the 1906 San Francisco earthquake. She was also the first superintendent to meet global war problems involving the procurement and assignment of nurses. As a result of her service during World War I, in which the ANC grew from less than 400 to 21,480 nurses serving in the United States, Europe, and the Philippines, she received the Distinguished Service Medal. After the war, she took a leave of absence and upon her return in December 1919 resigned as Superintendent. At her request, she was appointed Assistant Superintendent with duties in the Philippines. Thompson later became chief nurse of the Letterman General Hospital. When Army nurses were given relative rank in 1920, she became a captain.

References 

1876 births
1954 deaths
United States Army Nurse Corps officers